Ravensworth is a rural locality in the Shire of Mareeba, Queensland, Australia.

Geography
The Lynd River flows through from south-east to north. The Tate River flows from the east to join the Lynd in the centre.

References 

Shire of Mareeba
Localities in Queensland